See Ya, Simon is a novel for young adults by David Hill, about a boy suffering from muscular dystrophy. It was published in 1992.

Plot 
See Ya, Simon is a fictional novel of a boy suffering from muscular dystrophy. It is very pronounced throughout the story that Simon will not live for another year. Simon is a very righteous and humorous character who is never afraid to share his various opinions and does not seem to care that much despite him knowing he is going to die.

Main characters

Simon  
Simon Shaw has a family of four. An older sister Kirsti, his Mum and Dad. He likes role-playing and has a good sense of humour. He dislikes being left out and being treated differently. He is underweight with no build, due to his Muscular Dystrophy. He has brown hair and at times it seems that Simon has a spoilt personality because everyone gives him special treatment.

Nathan 
Nathan who is Simon's best friend has a family of four. His parents have split up and he has a little sister, Fiona. He looks thin and is of small build. He’s got brown hair and he treats Simon like a brother as they have a very close bond.

Minor Characters

Alex Wilson 
Alex is one of Nathan and Simon’s enemies. He is considered to be the school bully. Not much is said about Alex’s appearance but Nathan often refers to him as looking like an ‘ape’ or a ‘monkey’. Alex is not the smartest kid on the block. This is seen when Nathan makes fun of him saying “his brain is rolling around in his head”. Although Alex is a bully, when Simon died he was sensitive to Nathan.

Brady West 
Brady is the prettiest girl in Nathan’s and Simon’s class. Brady has long blonde hair, blue eyes and beautiful sense of style. Nathan has HUGE crush on her. But as the book goes on, Nathan gets to know her better and she might not be what she seems.

Setting 

The story takes place in New Zealand. The main settings are in Simon and Nathan's school, their homes, and the hospital.

New Zealand children's books
1992 novels
1992 children's books
20th-century New Zealand novels